Gu Xin (born 1956) is a former Chinese business executive and singer. Gu was the Board Chairman and Executive Manager of the  China Oriental Performing Arts Group, a state-owned arts group. On July 9, 2015, the Central Commission for Discipline Inspection (CCDI) issued a notice that it was investigating Gu for "serious violations of laws and regulations".

Gu is a member of the National Committee of CPPCC. He was also a member of the national standing committee of the China Democratic League. He is also the Vice-President of Chinese Musicians Association. Gu is a doctoral supervisor at the Chinese Academy of Arts and Nanjing Arts University. He is a professor at Nanjing University and Southeast China University, he is also a visiting professor for schools in the Netherlands.

Career
Hu was born in Suzhou, Jiangsu, in 1956. Gu entered Nanjing Arts University in 1973, he studied music under professor Li Zongpu. After graduation in 1977 he was assigned to Jiangsu Performing Arts Group as a vocal solo.

In 1981, he was accepted to Shanghai Conservatory of Music, he studied music under Tan Bingruo and Zhou Xiaoyan.

In 1982, he went to the United States to perform with the group.

In 1986, he won a special award at the sixteenth Paris International Vocal Music Competition in France.

In 1987, he was the head of philharmonic society of Jiangsu Song and Dance Theatre. In 1989, he was transferred to Jiangsu Opera Troupe as the head of philharmonic society.

In October 1989, he won the "Zijin Drama Award" at the second China Art Festival.

In July 1990, he was promoted to become Vice-President of Jiangsu Song and Dance Theatre. Five months later, he was promoted again to the President position.

In May 1995, he was appointed as deputy head of Jiangsu Provincial Culture Department.

On October 9, 2011, he became the President of Jiangsu Art Theatre and Executive Manager of Jiangsu Performing Arts Group.

In January 2010, he served as the Board Chairman and Executive Manager of the  China Oriental Performing Arts Group, and served until July 2015, while he was investigated by the Central Commission for Discipline Inspection of the Communist Party of China for "serious violations of discipline and law".

Awards

References 

1956 births
Living people
People from Suzhou
Nanjing University of the Arts alumni
Shanghai Conservatory of Music alumni
Chinese male singers
Singers from Suzhou